The Holy Mountain is a 1926 German mountain film directed by Arnold Fanck and starring Leni Riefenstahl, Luis Trenker and Frida Richard. It was the future filmmaker Riefenstahl's first screen appearance as an actress. Written by Arnold Fanck and Hans Schneeberger, the film is about a dancer who meets and falls in love with an engineer at his cottage in the mountains. After she gives her scarf to one of his friends, the infatuated friend mistakenly believes that she loves him. When the engineer sees her innocently comforting his friend, he mistakenly believes she is betraying him.

Cast
Leni Riefenstahl as Diotima
Luis Trenker as Karl
Frida Richard as Mother
Ernst Petersen as Vigo
Friedrich Schneider as Colli
Hannes Schneider as Mountain Guide

Production
The film began production in January 1925, but then was delayed due to weather and hospitalization of three actors. The film cost  to produce (equivalent to € million in ), and was released during the 1926 Christmas season.

Release and reception
Popular in Berlin, where sold-out performances extended its premiere run for five weeks, it was also screened in Britain, France and US: the first international success of its director.  Some critics were not impressed with the film, one of the most expensive efforts released by the German studio UFA in a year which was otherwise marked by a policy of retrenchment and the departure of respected studio head Erich Pommer. The film was compared unfavourably with the much less costly Madame Wants No Children directed by Alexander Korda.

The Holy Mountain was released on DVD in the by Kino Video on 12 August 2003 and by Eureka Video on 21 June 2004. The film was re-released by both Kino Video on 24 April 2018.

References
Notes

Bibliography

External links

The Holy Mountain at Silent Era

1920s adventure drama films
German adventure drama films
Films of the Weimar Republic
German black-and-white films
German silent feature films
Mountaineering films
Films directed by Arnold Fanck
Films set in the Alps
UFA GmbH films
1926 drama films
1920s German-language films
Silent adventure drama films
1920s German films